The Orient-Institut Beirut (OIB) is one of ten German Humanities Institutes Abroad which belong to the Max Weber Foundation. The OIB was established in 1961 by the Deutsche Morgenländische Gesellschaft (German Oriental Society) and is part of the Max Weber Foundation since 2003. The OIB supports and promotes independent research on the historical and contemporary Middle East and the Arab world in cooperation with researchers and academic institutions throughout the region.

History 
The Orient-Institut Beirut was founded in 1961 by the German Oriental Society (Deutsche Morgenländische Gesellschaft), an academic association founded in 1845 to promote the study of the languages and cultures of the “Orient”. It was financed by the German Federal Ministry of Research and Technology, the Fritz Thyssen Foundation, the VolkswagenStiftung and the German Research Association (DFG). In 1963, the institute gained the legal recognition of the Lebanese government and moved to its present premises in the former Villa Maud Farajallah in the quarter of Zokak al-Blat, near the downtown area of Beirut. Since 2003 the Orient-Institut Beirut belongs to the Max Weber Foundation – German Humanities Institutes Abroad. After the German staff had to be temporarily evacuated to Istanbul in 1987, the Orient-Institut Istanbul (OI Istanbul) – which had been a branch of the Beirut institute for 20 years – became an independent institution inside the Max Weber Foundation in 2009. The OIB, which conducts and supports research on historical and contemporary issues related to Lebanon and the Arab world, has increased his cooperation with academic partners in Egypt since 2010 and maintained an office in Cairo.

Academic profile and tasks 
The OIB is an interdisciplinary research institute. The study of social, religious, and intellectual history, as well as the study of literature, language and politics figures among the various projects undertaken at the institute. It is part of the OIB's mission to support young academic researchers. The Orient-Institut Beirut employs research associates and supports PhD students, post-docs, research projects, affiliated researchers, and scholars working on the Middle East. The OIB cooperates with numerous academic institutions and organizes academic events (lectures, seminars, workshops, symposia, international conferences and congresses) on a wide variety of issues related to the MENA region. Local and international partnerships are crucial in designing and funding the institute’s projects. In particular, the OIB is at the forefront of facilitating research collaborations between institutions in the Arab world and institutions in Germany and Europe. It thereby seeks to encourage innovative academic perspectives on the region.

Library 
The library of the OIB is open for public use and offers around 140.000 volumes and 1.700 periodicals. Its collection includes studies on religion, philosophy, and law as well as on literature, history and contemporary themes related to the Middle East. Material is gathered in Western languages, in Arabic and occasionally in Persian and Turkish. All this is supplemented by academic literature from various related disciplines, including political science, social anthropology and sociology. One of the richest resources of the OIB is its collections of periodicals covering politics, religion, and culture as well as several literary magazines published in the Middle East.

Publication series 
The OIB publishes two series of publications and one online-publication.
 In the series Bibliotheca Islamica manuscripts dating back from the 11th century onwards are edited as books. These critical editions include Arabic, Persian and Turkish texts - on topics ranging from history, prosopography, philosophy, literature and theology to Sufism. 
 In the series Beiruter Texte und Studien (Beirut Texts and Studies)  academic studies, monographs, and conference proceedings are published in German, English, Arabic and French.
 In cooperation with the Orient-Institut Istanbul, the OIB publishes the online series Orient-Institut Studies on perspectivia.net. This series is meant to combine regional and trans-regional perspectives in Middle Eastern and Euro-Asian Studies.

List of directors  
 1961 – 1963  Hans Robert Roemer
 1963 – 1968  Fritz Steppat 
 1968 – 1973  Stefan Wild
 1974 – 1978  Peter Bachmann
 1979 – 1980  Ulrich Haarmann
 1981 – 1984  Gernot Rotter
 1984 – 1989  Anton Heinen
 1989 – 1994  Erika Glassen
 1994 – 1999  Angelika Neuwirth
 1999 – 2007  Manfred Kropp
 2007 - 2017  Stefan Leder
 2017 - 2022  Birgit Schäbler
 2022 - Now Thomas Würtz

Bibliography 
 Peskes, Esther/ Strohmeier, Martin (Hrg.): 1961-1991: Orient-Institut der Deutschen Morgenländischen Gesellschaft. Istanbul: Türk Hoechst 1991.
 Orient-Institut Beirut (Hrg.): 50 Years of Orient-Institut Beirut: Five Decades of German Research in/on the Near East. 1961 – 2011, Beirut 2011.
 Rotter, Gernot / Köhler, Wolfgang: Orient-Institut der Morgenländischen Gesellschaft in Beirut. Beirut: Imprimerie  Catholique 1981.

References 

1961 establishments in Lebanon
Research institutes in Lebanon
Multidisciplinary research institutes
Middle Eastern studies
Islamic studies
Arab studies
Max Weber Foundation